Fatou Jallow (born April 16, 1997) is a Guinean basketball player. She plays for Byrant University Bulldogs and also the Guinea women's national basketball team.

College
Jallow began her collegiate career at Cowley College before transferring to Salt Lake City Community College for her sophomore season and helped her team become Region Champions. She averaged 6.9 points,2.6 rebounds and 1.4 assists per game.

She later moved to Bryant University. As a junior in Bryant University, she appeared in 21 games making starts in 21, averaged 6 .9 points, 2.1 rebounds and 1.4 assists per game.

National Team Career
Jallow participated in the FIBA Women's AfroBasket 2021 with her national team and averaged 7 points per game, 2.3 rebounds per game, and 1 assists.

References

Guinean basketball players
Guinean sportswomen
1997 births
Living people
Bryant Bulldogs athletes
AfroBasket 2021
Sportspeople from Stockholm